A croupier or dealer is someone appointed at a gambling table to assist in the conduct of the game, especially in the distribution of bets and payouts. Croupiers are typically employed by casinos.

Origin of the word
Originally a "croupier" meant one who stood behind a gambler, with extra reserves of cash to back him up during a gambling session. The word derived from croupe (the rump of a horse) and was by way of analogy to one who rode behind on horseback. It later came to refer to one who was employed to collect the money from a gaming-table.

Originally a "dealer" meant one who was responsible for distributing cards or the player in the dealer position, regardless of whether or not that player was responsible for distributing the cards.

Training 

Training methods to become a casino croupier vary from country to country. In North America, blackjack is almost always the game that dealers learn first, as it is simple and popular, and when the dealer makes errors, they tend not to cost the casino much money. In Europe, croupiers tend to learn roulette first. Complex, busy games such as craps, with complicated payout systems, etc., are usually reserved for the most competent and/or ambitious dealers.

Select colleges and non-collegiate third-level educational institutions now offer croupier training courses, formally dubbed Casino Operations Training, which when put in a historical context is a milestone achievement for the legitimization of poker in the mainstream. Besides courses, there's a host of private lessons available on social media, poker forums and classifieds sections worldwide, which could serve even better than attending an official course, giving one-on-one apprentice–master attention.

Casinos may also offer an in-house training program. However, sometimes it serves better to get a "general qualification" than to be trained exclusively into one company's way of operating. Prospective employers often prefer candidates without fully relevant experience over a candidate highly experienced in the idiosyncrasies of another operation. In Canada, this position is also known as a dealer and in addition to gaming experience requires excellent soft skills to interact with the visitors and sell them the idea of visiting the gaming establishment one more time to play again.

Licensing 
American, Australian, Canadian and British croupiers are required to apply for a gambling license. This license includes police background checks and credit rating checks, to help determine if they are eligible to commence employment. Croupiers are not permitted to deal at a casino until being issued this license.

Tipping 
As is common with customer service staff in the United States, croupiers there depend on tips to make their wage worthwhile. While a croupier should theoretically have no personal interest in the outcome of the game, a successful player customarily tips the croupier, especially in American casinos. Tips are often pooled and divided amongst all the staff. Fraternising with customers is frowned upon, and most casinos prevent their gambling staff from being seen smoking or even being seen in uniform outside the casino. Some gambling strategies include suggestions to tip the casino dealer in order to create a good atmosphere and improve dealer's mood. According to these strategies, tipping might even make the dealer shuffle the cards less frequently and thereby allow easier tracking of particular cards. Australian casinos forbid dealers from taking tips.

Secondhand smoke exposure
Because casinos tend to allow smoking on the gambling floor, American croupiers are exposed to secondhand smoke. A health hazard evaluation of several Las Vegas casinos showed that nonsmoker croupiers suffered from more respiratory ailments than their administrative counterparts at the casinos and had cotinine and NNAL (both components of secondhand smoke) in their urine samples. Britain banned smoking in all public places, including casinos, in 2007.

See also
Poker dealer

References

External links

Personal care and service occupations
Gambling terminology